The Lassise–Schettini House, also known as La Quinta, is a historic house in Sabana Grande, Puerto Rico.  It was designed by architect Luis Perocier and built in 1924 for Dr. Enrique Lassise, a physician and "remembered good-samaritan" of the town of Sabana Grande and his wife
Matilde Schettini, a school teacher.

It was listed on the National Register of Historic Places in 1987.

It is a two-story building with a mix of architectural styles, showing influence of the style of the traditional plantation house of the United States Gulf Coast and the Caribbean, of the Chicago Prairie style, and of the Moorish-Spanish Revival.

Perocier learned from more renowned Czech architect Antonin Nechodoma, who himself settled in Puerto Rico eventually after studying with Frank Lloyd Wright under Louis Sullivan.  While most of Nechodoma's works in Puerto Rico are gone;  La Quinta survives as "one of the few major examples of prairie-influenced
structures in Puerto Rico and the only intact manor house of its kind in Sabana Grande."

References

Sabana Grande, Puerto Rico
Houses completed in 1924
Houses on the National Register of Historic Places in Puerto Rico
Prairie School architecture
1924 establishments in Puerto Rico
Moorish Revival architecture in Puerto Rico